Mason County Schools is a public school district headquartered in Maysville, Kentucky. The district serves the rural area of Mason County, Kentucky with a population of approximately 17,150 in 2018. 

In 1990 the Maysville Independent School District merged into the Mason County school district.

Schools
 Mason County High School
 Mason County Middle School
 Mason County Intermediate School
 Straub Elementary School
 Area Technology Center

Board of Education 
The district is governed by the Mason County Schools Board of Education, composed of five elected members. For the 2019-2020 academic year, the board was governed by:

References

External links
 Mason County Schools
Education in Mason County, Kentucky
School districts in Kentucky